Model 17 may refer to:

Aircraft
 Beechcraft Model 17 Staggerwing, 1930s U.S. biplane with negative wing stagger
 Bell Model 17 Airacuda, 1940s U.S. heavy fighter
 Consolidated Model 17, 1920s U.S. cargo monoplane
 Curtiss Model 17, 1920s U.S. biplane
 FBA Model 17, 1920s French flying boat trainer

Firearms
 Glock model 17 gun
 Remington Model 17 pump-action shotgun
 Smith & Wesson Model 17 double-action sixshooter revolver

Other uses
 Model 17 grenade (Eierhandgranate), German WWI handgrenade

See also

 Sig Sauer M2017 pistol (Model 2017)
 Model 1817 common rifle, U.S. flintlock
 M1917 (disambiguation), including Model 1917
 
 Model (disambiguation)
 M17 (disambiguation)
 17 (disambiguation)
 Type 17 (disambiguation)
 Class 17 (disambiguation)